This is a list of churches in  Vordingborg Municipality in southeastern Denmark. The municipality consists of the southernmost part of Zealand as well as several smaller islands, including Møn, Bogø and Nyord.

Bogø

Møn

Nyord

Zealand

See also
 List of churches on Falster
 List of churches on Lolland
 List of churches in Roskilde Municipality

References

External links

 
Vordingborg